Charleston nine may refer to:

 Charleston Sofa Super Store fire, on June 18, 2007, at Charleston Sofa Super Store
 Charleston church shooting, on June 17, 2015, at Emanuel African Methodist Episcopal Church